The 1999 Campeonato Ecuatoriano de Fútbol de la Serie A was the 41st season of the Serie A, the top level of professional football in Ecuador. LDU Quito successfully defended their title and won their sixth national championship.

First stage

Second stage

Relegation Liguilla

Liguilla Final

Championship finals

External links
Official website 
1999 season on RSSSF

1999
Ecu
Football